Barrie Craig, Confidential Investigator was a detective drama heard on NBC Radio from October 3, 1951 to June 30, 1955.

Detective Barrie Craig (William Gargan) worked alone from his Madison Avenue office. Unlike his contemporaries Sam Spade and Philip Marlowe, Craig had a laid-back personality, somewhat cutting against the popular hard-boiled detective stereotype. Others in the cast included Ralph Bell, Elspeth Eric, Parker Fennelly, Santos Ortega, Arnold Moss, Parley Baer, Virginia Gregg and Betty Lou Gerson. 

Don Pardo was the announcer.

Gargan also starred in the role in an unsuccessful 1952 TV pilot written and directed by Blake Edwards. It was presented on ABC's Pepsi-Cola Playhouse as "Death the Hard Way" (October 17, 1954).

A few years earlier Gargan had played a similar character in Martin Kane, Private Eye.

References

External links

Streaming audio
 Radio Lovers: Barrie Craig, Confidential Investigator
 59 episodes of Barrie Craig, Confidential Investigator from Internet Archive

Logs
 Episodic log of Barrie Craig, Confidential Investigator from Jerry Haendiges Vintage Radio Logs
 Episodic log (and more) of Barrie Craig, Confidential Investigator from The Digital Deli Too
 Episodic log of Barrie Craig, Confidential Investigator from RadioGOLDINdex

American radio dramas
Detective radio shows
1951 radio programme debuts
1955 radio programme endings
NBC radio programs
Craig, Barrie
1950s American radio programs
New York City in fiction